This Food Network reality show is a kids cook-off which premiered in August 2015 with eight kids. Each week one kid is eliminated after participating in two cook-offs. The winner of the first competition gets immunity from elimination. After the second competition one of the remaining children in eliminated. The winner will get a $20,000 cash price toward their culinary education and their own web series on the Food Network web site.

External links
 

Food Network original programming
2015 American television series debuts
2010s American reality television series
Television series about children